Háry János is a 1965 Hungarian musical film directed by Miklós Szinetár and starring Ádám Szirtes, Mária Medgyesi and Teri Tordai. It is an adaptation of the folk opera Háry János which had previously been made into a film in 1941.

Cast
 Ádám Szirtes - Háry János 
 Mária Medgyesi - Örzse 
 Teri Tordai - Mária Lujza 
 Manyi Kiss - Császárné 
 László Bánhidi - Marci 
 László Márkus - Ebelasztin 
 Samu Balázs -  Császár 
 Gyula Bodrogi - Napoleon 
 Sándor Tompa - Ivócimbora 
 Sándor Peti - Ivócimbora 
 László Misoga - Kocsmáros 
 László Keleti - Krucifix generális 
 Lajos Cs. Németh - Jóska 
 Gábor Koncz - Diák 
 Endre Harkányi - Osztrák tábornok

External links
 

1965 films
1965 musical comedy films
Hungarian musical comedy films
1960s Hungarian-language films
Films based on operas
Napoleonic Wars films
Depictions of Napoleon on film